The California Raisins were a fictional rhythm and blues animated musical group as well as advertising and merchandising characters composed of anthropomorphized raisins. Lead vocals were sung by musician Buddy Miles. The California Raisins were popular in the mid-to-late 1980s through claymation TV commercials and animated specials, winning an Emmy Award and one nomination.

Origin and success
The concept was originally created by advertising firm Foote, Cone & Belding (FCB) for a 1986 Sun-Maid commercial on behalf of the California Raisin Advisory Board when one of the writers, Seth Werner (at the time with FCB in San Francisco) came up with an idea for the new raisin commercial, saying, "We have tried everything but dancing raisins singing 'I Heard It Through the Grapevine'" (the 1968 song popularized by Marvin Gaye). To their surprise, the commercial became wildly popular, paving the way for several future commercials and opportunities through other media. The commercials were produced by Vinton Studios using their claymation technique, with character designs by Michael Brunsfeld. The following year, the Raisins appeared in the Emmy Award-winning A Claymation Christmas Celebration, singing the Christmas carol "Rudolph the Red-Nosed Reindeer".

The California Raisins released four studio albums on Priority Records, BMG, and ZTT Records between 1987 and 1994, and their signature song, "I Heard It Through the Grapevine", landed on the Billboard Hot 100 and peaked at number 84 or 85. However, the Raisins would continue to make their strongest impression through animated endeavors, and the characters proved popular enough that they were used to endorse Post Raisin Bran cereal.

On November 4, 1988, CBS aired a primetime television special called Meet the Raisins! The musical mockumentary was again created by Vinton Studios, and was nominated for a Primetime Emmy Award. It also gave the band members individual names and roles: A.C. (vocals), Beebop (drums), Stretch (bass), and Red (guitar/piano).

A Saturday morning cartoon series, The California Raisin Show, debuted the following year, but lasted only 13 episodes. While cel animated by Murakami-Wolf-Swenson, it maintained Will Vinton's creative direction. A sequel to the original CBS special aired in 1990 under the title The Raisins: Sold Out! - The California Raisins II. This special saw the Raisins hiring a new manager with the goal of making a comeback.

Merchandise
Many of the items created for the campaign have become part of the permanent collection of the Smithsonian Institution. Merchandise sales included toys and Raisins images on nearly every conceivable medium: lunch boxes, notebooks, clothing, posters, bedsheets, and even a Halloween costume, just to name a few. A California Raisins Fan Club began in 1987, which included a Grapevine Gazette newsletter and various memorabilia. Blackthorne Publishing also released a six-issue comic book series entitled The California Raisins 3-D which included 3D glasses; these would later be re-released in the Ultimate Collection trade paperback.

Several California Raisins music albums were also released, featuring classic Motown and rock standards. These albums were included in the Smithsonian collection and were illustrated and art-directed by Helane Freeman, who later became famous for her work on Hannah Montana and The Suite Life of Zack & Cody, among other Disney programs.

Perhaps the most memorable piece of California Raisins merchandise, however, came in the form of small, non-poseable California Raisins figures. The Hardee's restaurant chain offered these as part of a promotion for its Cinnamon 'N' Raisin biscuits. Different collections were produced in 1987, 1988, 1991, and finally in 2001 (the latter adding Carl's Jr. due to their late '90s acquisition of Hardee's) for their new stylization. This latest incarnation can still be seen on the California Raisin Marketing Board website.

In the early 1990s, Capcom produced a video game for the Nintendo Entertainment System (NES) titled The California Raisins: The Grape Escape, in which the player controlled a California Raisin through five side-scrolling levels battling various evil fruit and vegetable characters that have stolen the Raisins' music. The game was completed and several video game critics reviewed it, but it was never released on the open market.

Box Office Software produced a different, unrelated California Raisins computer game in 1988 for the Apple II, Commodore 64, and PC compatibles. The plot of the game involved Tiny Goodbite having to rescue his friends who have been kidnapped and held in a cereal factory.

Decline
Although popular with the public, the California Raisin campaign eventually failed because its production cost the raisin growers almost twice their earnings. CALRAB, the organization who made the campaign, was also closed on July 31, 1994, due to disagreements with raisin producers over the fairness of required payments to the organization.

Post-popularity and legacy
On March 28, 1997 Entertainment Weekly published "The 50 Best Commercials of All Time" as its cover story. The article ranked The California Raisins' premiere advertisement, "Lunchbox", at #15 with comments by ad agency executive Claude Jacques and described the Raisins as "The coolest wrinkled musicians this side of the Stones."

The vast amount of California Raisins merchandise has made for a substantial collectors' market. It even led to an unauthorized collectibles guide published in 1998, cataloging the many items based on the clay characters.

In 2002, the Food Network program Unwrapped featured a segment on The California Raisins featuring interviews with Will Vinton, David Altschul, and Mark Gustafson of Vinton Studios. Concept illustrations of the Raisins were also featured as interviewees discussed the characters' creation.

In The Simpsons episode 'Tis the Fifteenth Season", The California Raisins were spoofed as The California Prunes, on a special entitled Christmas with the California Prunes.

The comedy podcast Felix Navipod features discussion of the California Raisins on all 166 episodes of its run.

An article published by AnimateClay.com in the late 2000s details the whereabouts of the original claymation sculptures used by Vinton Studios. The figures were kept in a box for several years and headed for the trash before being obtained by Webster Colcord, a former employee of Vinton. Several photos were taken providing a close look at the Raisins' internal armatures and detailing their extremely poor condition, including the absence of the A.C. puppet's head.

As of the 2010s, packages of Sun-Maid Natural California Raisins still feature an updated California Raisin character. This figure is also included on CalRaisins.org.

In 2010, claymation versions of the California Raisins were featured in the special Christmas episode of It's Always Sunny in Philadelphia, "A Very Sunny Christmas".

In 2014, the California Raisins made a cameo appearance in the RadioShack Super Bowl XLVIII commercial "The '80s Called".

In 2016, the California Raisins made an appearance in the cartoon show American Dad. Characters Steve and Roger go into a mall representing 1980s culture where they meet the Raisins who proclaim that they are "cursed to live forever."

In 2017, an episode of The Simpsons called "The Cad and the Hat" included a couch gag segment featuring the California Raisins being killed by Homer.

In 2018, an episode of The Americans called "Rififi" feature a cereal box featuring the California Raisins on the back.

Planned film
In 2015, it was announced that a live-action/CGI reboot of the California Raisins would be produced, with president of The Actors Hall of Fame Foundation, Rusty Citron, as one of the people behind the project.

Discography
The California Raisins Sing the Hit Songs - 1987, Priority Records and BMG
"What Does It Take (To Win Your Love)" b/w "I Got You (I Feel Good)" - 1988, Purple Vinyl 7"
"I Heard it Through the Grapevine" - 1988 (single, extended peaked at #84 on the Billboard Hot 100)
Sweet, Delicious, & Marvelous - 1988, Priority Records and BMG
Meet the Raisins! - 1988, Atlantic Records
Christmas with The California Raisins - 1988, Priority Records and BMG
The California Raisins Live At The Buena Park Mall - 1989 Priority Records, BMG, and Elektra Records
The California Raisins In La Habra - 1990 Priority Records and ZTT Records
The California Raisins In Buena Park - 1990 Priority Records, BMG, and ZTT Records
The California Raisins In Tustin - 1990 Priority Records, BMG, and ZTT Records
The California Raisins In Westminster - 1991 Priority Records, BMG, and ZTT Records
The California Raisins In Costa Mesa - 1991 Priority Records, BMG, and ZTT Records
The California Raisins In Los Angeles - 1992 Priority Records, BMG, and ZTT Records
The California Raisins In Dana Point - 1992 Priority Records, BMG, and ZTT Records
The California Raisins In Garden Grove - 1992 Priority Records, BMG, and ZTT Records
The California Raisins In Anaheim - 1992 Priority Records, BMG, and ZTT Records
The California Raisins In Irvine - 1992 Priority Records, BMG, and ZTT Records
The California Raisins In Santa Ana - 1992 Priority Records, BMG, and ZTT Records
The California Raisins In Aliso Viejo - 1993 Priority Records, BMG, and ZTT Records
The California Raisins In Mission Viejo - 1993 Priority Records, BMG, and ZTT Records
The California Raisins In Orange - 1993 Priority Records, BMG, and ZTT Records
The California Raisins In Brea - 1993 Priority Records, BMG, and ZTT Records
The California Raisins In Hollywood - 1993 Priority Records, BMG, and ZTT Records
The California Raisins In Pasadena - 1994 Priority Records, BMG, and ZTT Records

Awards and nominations
A Claymation Christmas Celebration - Primetime Emmy
Meet the Raisins! - Primetime Emmy nominee

References

External links
[ All Music Entry]

California Raisins NES Game
Official Will Vinton (LAIKA) Studios Site
New Laika Studio Site (Will Vinton)
California Raisins Marketing Board official website
The Clay and Stop-Motion Animation How-To Page: "California Raisin Raisin Puppets: Late 80s - Early 90s"

1980s fads and trends
1988 in comics
Animated musical groups
Blackthorne Publishing titles
Clay animation
Fictional food characters
Fictional humanoids
Fictional musical groups
Food advertising characters
Fruit and vegetable characters
Mascots introduced in 1986
Male characters in advertising
Priority Records artists
Raisins